The 2014 FIVB Volleyball Men's Club World Championship was the 10th edition of the event. It was held in Belo Horizonte, Brazil from 5 to 10 May 2014. The Russian club Belogorie Belgorod won the title for the first time.

Qualification

Pools composition

Squads

Venue

Pool standing procedure
 Match points
 Number of matches won
 Sets ratio
 Points ratio
 Result of the last match between the tied teams

Match won 3–0 or 3–1: 3 match points for the winner, 0 match points for the loser
Match won 3–2: 2 match points for the winner, 1 match point for the loser

Preliminary round
All times are Brasília Time (UTC−03:00).

Pool A

|}

|}

Pool B

|}

|}

Final round
All times are Brasília Time (UTC−03:00).

Semifinals

|}

3rd place match

|}

Final

|}

Final standing

Awards

Most Valuable Player
 Dmitry Muserskiy (Belogorie Belgorod)
Best Setter
 Raphael Oliveira (Al-Rayyan)
Best Outside Spikers
 Sergey Tetyukhin (Belogorie Belgorod)
 Matey Kaziyski (Al-Rayyan)

Best Middle Blockers
 Robertlandy Simón (Al-Rayyan)
 José Santos Júnior (UPCN San Juan)
Best Opposite Spiker
 Wallace de Souza (Sada Cruzeiro)
Best Libero
 Alan Domingos (Al-Rayyan)

External links
Official website
Final Standing
Awards
Statistics

2014 FIVB Men's Club World Championship
FIVB Men's Club World Championship
FIVB Men's Club World Championship
FIVB Volleyball Men's Club World Championship
Sport in Belo Horizonte